{{DISPLAYTITLE:C11H12N4O3S}}
The molecular formula C11H12N4O3S (molar mass: 280.30 g/mol, exact mass: 280.0630 u) may refer to:

 Sulfalene
 Sulfamethoxypyridazine
 Sulfametoxydiazine